Nickel City may refer to:

A nickname for Greater Sudbury, Ontario, Canada
A nickname for Thompson, Manitoba, Canada
A nickname for Buffalo, New York, U.S.

See also
Nickel City Opera, founded by operatic bass Valerian Ruminski in Buffalo, New York, U.S.